is a prominent Japanese-born violinist. She has recorded for the RCA Victor Red Seal label.

Born in Ōbu, Aichi, she started her training in Japan as a part of the Suzuki Method program and was part of a tour of the United States. She is a graduate of the Juilliard School (1989) where her teacher was Dorothy DeLay. Ms. Takezawa won the gold medal in 1986, and served as a judge for the International Violin Competition of Indianapolis.

She played on the Stradivarius loaned to her by the Nippon Music Foundation until it was sold at auction in 2006 for US$3,544,000.

Discography
Tchaikovsky / Prokofiev / Violin Concertos (LaserDisc)
Kyoko Takezawa, violin
Moscow Radio Symphony Orchestra, Conducted by Vladimir Fedoseyev
RCA Victor Red Seal

Concerto! / Bartók Violin Concerto No. 2 (DVD)
Kyoko Takezawa, violin
London Symphony Orchestra, Conducted by Michael Tilson Thomas
Interviewer: Dudley Moore
RCA Victor Red Seal

Violin for Relaxation
Various Artists
RCA Victor Red Seal

Bartók / Brahms / Chaminade / Falla / Tchaikovsky
Kyoko Takezawa, violin
Pillip Moll, piano
RCA Victor Red Seal

Saint-Saëns / Debussy / Ravel / French Violin Sonatas
Kyoko Takezawa, violin
Rohan de Silva, piano
RCA Victor Red Seal

Tchaikovsky / Prokofiev / Violin Concertos
Kyoko Takezawa, violin
Moscow Radio Symphony Orchestra, Conducted by Vladimir Fedoseyev
RCA Victor Red Seal

Mendelssohn Violin Concertos
Kyoko Takezawa, violin
Bamberg Symphony, Conducted by Claus Peter Flor
RCA Victor Red Seal

Elgar Violin Concerto
Kyoko Takezawa, violin
Bavarian Radio Symphony Orchestra, Conducted by Sir Colin Davis
RCA Victor Red Seal

Bartók Violin Concerto No. 2
Kyoko Takezawa, violin
London Symphony Orchestra, Conducted by Michael Tilson Thomas
RCA Victor Red Seal

Barber Concerto for Violin Op. 14, Concerto for Cello in A minor
Kyoko Takezawa, violin
Steven Isserlis, cello
St. Louis Symphony Orchestra, Conducted by Leonard Slatkin
Jacob Berg, Peter Bowman, Susan Slaughter 
RCA Victor Red Seal

Aria on the Strings
Tarō Iwashiro and Kyoko Takezawa
BMG Fan House (Japan)

Romanza
Kyoko Takezawa, violin
Akira Eguchi, piano
BMG Fan House (Japan)

References
Kyoko Takezawa Official Website

External links 
 

1966 births
Japanese classical violinists
Living people
People from Ōbu, Aichi
Juilliard School alumni
Musicians from Aichi Prefecture
21st-century classical violinists
Women classical violinists